Clarendon railway station is located on the Richmond line, serving the Sydney suburb of Clarendon. It is served by Sydney Trains T1 Western and T5 Cumberland line services.

History
Clarendon station opened in 1870 as Hawkesbury Racecourse, being renamed Clarendon on 1 November 1876.

Platforms & services
Historically, Clarendon has been served by services operating from Sydney CBD/North Shore, branching off the Western Line at Blacktown (under the service title of T1 Richmond). However, after a major timetable change for the Sydney Trains network on 26 November 2017, Cumberland line services started continuing out to Richmond, rather than terminating at Schofields, during the late night, taking over from the Richmond line at these times.

Transport links
Clarendon station is served by one NightRide route:
N71: Richmond station to Town Hall station

Air show service
An annual air show takes place on the adjacent RAAF Base Richmond and special train services operate. The line west of Clarendon to Richmond is downgraded to a siding, and as trains arrive at Clarendon, terminate and stable on the temporary siding beyond. A connecting bus maintains a passenger service to East Richmond and Richmond stations.

Trackplan

References

External links

Clarendon station details Transport for New South Wales

Railway stations in Sydney
Railway stations in Australia opened in 1870
Richmond railway line
City of Hawkesbury